Tony Allen (born 4 March 1945) is an English comedian and writer. Best known as one of the original "alternative comedians", Tony Allen's artistic career had taken many radical turns before he temporarily abandoned his Speakers' Corner "Full-Frontal Anarchy Platform" in May 1979 for the stage of London's Comedy Store. Two months later he founded Alternative Cabaret with Alexei Sayle and ran a regular "Alt Cab" Club night in the back bar of the Elgin pub on Ladbroke Grove.

Plays 
In 1973, Allen was co-founder with John Miles of Rough Theatre and co-wrote and performed in all five of its productions. The most memorable was Dwelling Unit Sweet Dwelling Unit (1973)—which he later adapted for BBC Radio 4's Thirty-Minute Theatre (1977)—and Free Milk and Orange Juice (1976), which had a short run at the ICA.
 
During the seventies Allen wrote three more radio plays including an Afternoon Theatre play, Two Fingers Finnegan Comes Again, co-written with Vernon Magee and bespoke for the actor Wilfrid Brambell. He went on to devise and write over twenty plays for fringe and community theatre, most memorably, Metropolitan with Ken Robinson, for the Young People's Theatre Scheme at The Royal Court Theatre; and various productions at The Theatre Royal, Stratford East, including their Christmas panto Robin Hood (1975), which he co-wrote with Heathcote Williams. He later co-wrote a television play with Ken Robinson—Que Sera for TVS's Dramarama.

Journalism 
Allen's obsession with small press journalism led him into countless publishing ventures, most notoriously the vacant property bulletins of the "Ruff Tuff Creem Puff Estate Agency for Squatters", again with Heathcote Williams (1975–76); the Ladbroke Grove monthly "Corrugated Times" (1976); "The New Instant" with Chris Saunders (1985), and the eighth re-launch of "International Times" (1986). Allen continued writing columns for radical journals, the most recent being "Lofty Tone" in the late 1990s DIY activist rag, Squall.

Scripts 
In the late eighties, Allen contributed regular scripts and prose to the youth comic magazines Crisis, Revolver and Judge Dredd – The Megazine. Of particular interest was a 24-page graphic documentary with artist Dave Hine about events leading to the Tiananmen Square massacre.

With his writing partner Max Handley (1945–1990) he was occasional script-writer for many TV and radio shows such as Spitting Image, Naked Video, Week Ending and Alas Smith and Jones. Allen and Handley were also responsible for the words to the daily three-frame comic strip "Soho Square" in the short-lived London Daily News; Pete Rigg was the cartoonist.

TV work 
He played an anarchist named Fisher in the first-series episode of The Young Ones, entitled "Interesting" (1982).

In 1989 and 1990, Allen and Caron Keating co-presented the Granada TV/Channel 4 science-based programme Fourth Dimension, which included performing (and co-writing with Handley) a weekly five-minute piece to camera, plus other filmed journalism.
 
In The Heckler, Allen was seen in a mentoring role to a couple of trainee hecklers, as the central theme for BBC3 TV's documentary about the history of political heckling at the hustings, coinciding with the 2005 General Election.

Stand-up comedy 
Affectionately known as the godfather of alternative comedy, Allen was resident comedian in the early days of The Comedy Store, London (1979–1980) and took over from Alexei Sayle as resident MC early in 1981.

In 1980, Tony Allen and Alexei Sayle took their solo stand-up acts to the Edinburgh Festival Fringe under the title "Late Night Alternative". Allen continued to appear on the Edinburgh Fringe for the next twelve years. Most successful was his "1984 Meaning of Life Crusade", with Sharon Landau and Roy Hutchins. In 1989, he acted the role of Clopin, King of the Thieves in Max Handley's stage musical Quasimodo.

In the early eighties, Allen supported rock bands, including Killing Joke at Theatre Royal, Drury Lane (1980) and The Clash at Portsmouth Town Hall (1981).  He also supported anarcho-punk band Poison Girls on two national "No Nukes Music" tours. 
 
In the late eighties, he was a founder member of Green Wedge, and performed in a series of one-off benefit gigs as MC/support to, among others, John Martyn, Osibisa and Joe Strummer's Latino Rockabilly War.

In 1990, Allen toured extensively with his solo show "Sold Out", about an Amazonian tribal shaman who understands both the workings of the futures exchange and the logic of Heisenberg's Uncertainty Principle. A truncated version of the Heisenberg piece was also featured on Granada TV's Fourth Dimension.

Economics, viewed as a bogus science for scam artists causing both personal and planetary debt, was one of the subjects tackled in his full-length stand-up Edinburgh show "Final Demand – The Grim Repo Man is at the Door" in 1993.

In 1994, Allen teamed up again with Sharon Landau and Roy Hutchins for a season of live cabaret gigs, "Ain't Necessarily Solo".
 
His last solo show before semi-retirement was "The End is Nigh", a mischievous piece of panic-mongering about the Y2K bug which took the form of a public meeting, and had its final performance, pertinently, at Speakers' Corner in October 1999, before he went to live in the hills of Cumbria for a year.

Workshops 
Tony Allen started teaching stand-up comedy in 1982. From the late eighties to the mid-nineties, he was a regular workshop tutor with the drama department of Middlesex University. Since 2003 he has had a similar relationship with the drama department at the University of Kent working with ex-comic Dr. Oliver Double.  Allen has been the artistic director of New Agenda Arts Trust since June 1995. Late in 1995, New Agenda launched the "Performance Club" to promote innovative performers and to showcase emerging workshop talent. In 2005, The Performance Club took up a two-year residency at the Inn on the Green, London W11. Most notable among the regular performers was Ken Campbell.

Publications 
Attitude! Wanna Make Something of it? The Secret of Stand-up Comedy – published by Gothic Image (2002).

A Summer in the Park. A Journal of Speakers' Corner – published by Freedom Press (2004)

Sound recordings 
One of Our Safety Valves is Missing – a 45-minute recorded live stage act produced by John Williams for Red Tapes (1980).

Alternative Cabaret – an album showcasing four alternative comedians: Tony Allen, Jim Barclay, Pauline Melville and Andy de la Tour (1981).

References

External links

1945 births
Living people
People from Hayes, Hillingdon
20th-century English comedians
21st-century English comedians
English male comedians
20th-century squatters